Ditrigona lineata is a moth in the family Drepanidae. It was described by John Henry Leech in 1898. It is found in China.

The wingspan is 17–19 mm for males and 19–24 mm for females. The forewings and hindwings are lustrous white, the forewings with the costa yellowish brown at the base, the remainder buff. The fasciae are brownish grey, sub-basal, antemedial, postmedial and two subterminal, all more or less evenly spaced. The hindwings are similar to the forewings.

Subspecies
Ditrigona lineata lineata (China: Yunnan, Sichuan)
Ditrigona lineata tephroides Wilkinson, 1968 (China: Shensi, Tibet)

References

Moths described in 1898
Drepaninae
Moths of Asia